Pierre Maille (born 14 June 1947) is a French politician.
 
Maille was Mayor of Brest from 1982 to 1983, succeeding Francis Le Blé, who died in office in 1982, and from 1989 to 2001.  He belongs to the French Socialist Party, and since 1998 has led the general council of the department of Finistère.

References

1947 births
Living people
People from Fréjus
Socialist Party (France) politicians
Mayors of places in Brittany
Politicians from Brest, France